TivoWeb is a web server which runs in TiVo-branded DVRs.

It adds functionality to TiVo such as being able to set recordings over the internet and undelete deleted shows. It also allows the addition of custom modules which add more features to TivoWeb.

There are three main versions of TivoWeb still in day to day use. TivoWeb 1.9.4 is the original TivoWeb project and is no longer maintained; the last release of it was v1.9.4 (an installation tivoweb.tar.gz file for this version can be downloaded from http://www.tivocentral.co.uk/hacks/tivoweb.html. The original TivoWeb project has been followed by TivoWebPlus v1.0 to v1.3.1 and then more recently by TivoWebPlus 2.0.0. and 2.1.0. TivoWeb 1.9.4 modules will usually work under TivoWebPlus v1.0 to v1.3.1; however, this version of TivoWebPlus has also frequently been criticized for being relatively unstable and prone to crashes and module hangs, especially on TiVos running large satellite or cable TV platform databases.

This resulted in the release of TivoWebPlus v2, a complete rewrite of the original TivoWeb code aimed at greatly increasing the stability of TivoWeb and also adding the ability to take advantage of the advanced hardware functionality of the very latest TiVo models whilst still also being compatible with the original Series 1 US and UK TiVo units. TivoWeb 1.9.4 and TivoWebPlus v1.0 to v1.3 modules do not work under TivoWebPlus v2 without certain internal alterations and amendments. However, the majority of modules and functionality add-ons from TivoWeb 1.9.4 and TivoWebPlus 1.0 to 1.3.1 have now been incorporated into TivoWebPlus 2.1.b3 (the current version at 25/2/09) and Portland Paw has also written a version of his www.tivohackman.com module that is directly compatible with this version of the TivoWeb project.

Current and historical TivoWeb modules and related TiVo user interface extensions

See also
 TiVo
 TiVo DVRs

External links
 TivoWeb project
 TivoWebPlus project
 TivoWebPlus 2.1 Development Thread
 Online TivoWeb Demo
 Installation Guide

Digital video recorders
Web